Cleora atriclava is a moth of the  family Geometridae. It is known from northern Madagascar.

It has a wingspan between 34–40 mm.

References

Cleora
Moths described in 1926
Moths of Madagascar